Mata Sundri College for Women also shortly known as Mata Sundari College is a constituent college of University of Delhi. The college was founded in 1967 by Delhi Sikhs Gurudwara Management Committee. At present 3737 students are enrolled in various Certificate, Diploma, undergraduate and Postgraduate courses available in the college. The college is located in the central Delhi and comes under the jurisdiction of the North Campus of University of Delhi.

Courses Offered

Undergraduate
B.A. (Hons) English
B.A. (Hons) Hindi
B.A. (Hons) History
B.A. (Hons) Philosophy
B.A. (Hons) Political Science
B.A. (Hons) Psychology
B.A. (Hons) Punjabi
B.A. (Hons) Sanskrit
B.A. Programme
B.Com.
B.Com. (Hons)
B.El.Ed.
B.Sc. (Hons) Mathematics

Add on Certificate/Diploma Courses

a. Part Time Certificate/Diploma/Advance Diploma:- 
Computer and its Applications
Textile Designing
Travel and Tourism
b. Certificate Courses in Foreign Languages:-
French
German
Spanish

See also
Education in India
Literacy in India
List of institutions of higher education in Delhi

References

External links
 http://ms.du.ac.in

Delhi University
Women's universities and colleges in Delhi
1967 establishments in Delhi
Educational institutions established in 1962